Lourdes Urrea (born 17 July 1954) is a Mexican author, artist and speaker.  She wrote her first poems at the age of twelve, and her first mystery story when she was sixteen years old.  She is the author of the "Cuentos de Escalofrío" and "Castillo del Terror" series for young readers.

Career
Urrea's short novels are used in the United States as reading material for bilingual middle graders.  She is the author of "English for the Latin Student" and "Spanish for the Foreign Student" language textbooks, and of two books of poetry: "Versos Prohibidos" and "Historias familiares". Urrea's multimedia lecture "The Goodness of Reading" has been presented in libraries and schools around the world.

Urrea's writing depicts her vast traveling and her desire to give children a glimpse of the diversity of cultures in the world.  Each of her stories takes place in a different country.  In November 2008, Urrea was honored with the Doctor Honoris Causa appointment by the Latin American Council of Excellence in Education for her contribution to education in Latin American countries.

Bibliography
 "Fuera de este mundo"
 "Los gatos muertos"
 "A través del cristal"
 "El dragón Chinese"
 "Huellas en la escalera"
 "Silencio en el castillo"
 "Vacaciones mortales"
 "El Circo"
 "La gruta encantada"
 "El juego de ajedrez"
 "En busca de Dancu"
 "Un extraño mal"
 "Un juego peligroso"
 "No juegues de noche"
 "Athon Labar"
 "El secreto gitano"
 "El mago"
 "El niño de la ventana"
 "El reloj de arena"
 "El regreso de Dancu"
 "Un fantasma en Navidad"
 "Una aventura en Mahali"
 "La niña del cuadro"
 "Cedric, una leyenda nueja"

References
Castillo Macmillan Publishing Group
Instituto de la Lengua- Monterrey, Mexico
Public Library Rudy Lozano- Chicago, IL
Instituto Cervantes Public Library- Cairo, Egypt

External links
 http://www.lourdesurrea.com
 http://www.cenlang.info

Mexican children's writers
Living people
1954 births
Writers from Sinaloa
People from Mazatlán
Mexican women children's writers
20th-century Mexican writers
21st-century Mexican writers
20th-century Mexican women writers
21st-century Mexican women writers